The Cap-au-Saumon lighthouse is a lighthouse on the St. Lawrence River in Quebec. It is located at Saint-Siméon, in the region of Charlevoix, midway between Port-au-Persil and Port-Saumon.

Description 
It is surrounded by several outbuildings, including the lighthouse keeper's house. The lighthouse is perched on an escarpment of  dominating the river.

History 
The Carré family has provided three successive caretakers for the Cap-au-Saumon lighthouse:
 Louis-Philippe Carré (1942-1966);
 Edmour Carré, son of Louis-Philippe (1966-1972);
 Neil Carré, son of Louis-Philippe (1972-1982).
The lighthouse remained abandoned for about thirty years before being restored carefully. It is now rented by the week.

Notes and references 

Lighthouses in Quebec
Lighthouses completed in the 19th century
La Malbaie
Buildings and structures in Capitale-Nationale